The Nimitz class is a class of ten nuclear-powered aircraft carriers in service with the United States Navy. The lead ship of the class is named after World War II United States Pacific Fleet commander Fleet Admiral Chester W. Nimitz, who was the last living U.S. Navy officer to hold the rank.

Instead of the gas turbines or diesel-electric systems used for propulsion on many modern warships, the carriers use two A4W pressurized water reactors. As a result of nuclear power, the ships are capable of operating for over 20 years without refueling and are predicted to have a service life of over 50 years. They are categorized as nuclear-powered aircraft carriers and are numbered with consecutive hull numbers between CVN-68 and CVN-77.

All ten carriers were constructed by Newport News Shipbuilding Company in Virginia. Since the 1970s, Nimitz-class carriers have participated in many conflicts and operations across the world, including Operation Eagle Claw in Iran, the Gulf War, and more recently in Iraq and Afghanistan.

The angled flight decks of the carriers use a CATOBAR arrangement to operate aircraft, with steam catapults and arrestor wires for launch and recovery. As well as speeding up flight deck operations, this allows for a much wider variety of aircraft than with the STOVL arrangement used on smaller carriers. An embarked carrier air wing comprising around 64 aircraft is normally deployed on board. The air wings' strike fighters are primarily F/A-18E and F/A-18F Super Hornets. In addition to their aircraft, the vessels carry short-range defensive weaponry for anti-aircraft warfare and missile defense.

Description
As the vessels were overhauled and installed more equipment, loaded displacement would climb to exceed . For example,  currently displaces  at full load. The ships' nominal complement comprises: 3,000–3,200; 1,500 (air wing); and 500 (other).

Design
The ships were designed to be improvements on previous U.S. aircraft carriers, particularly the Enterprise and  supercarriers, although the arrangement of the vessels is relatively similar to that of the Kitty Hawk class. Among other design improvements, the two reactors on Nimitz-class carriers take up less space than the eight reactors used on Enterprise. Along with a more generally improved design, Nimitz-class carriers can carry 90% more aviation fuel and 50% more ordnance when compared to the Forrestal class.

The U.S. Navy has stated that the carriers could withstand three times the damage sustained by the  inflicted by Japanese air attacks during World War II. The hangars on the ships are divided into three fire bays by thick steel doors that are designed to restrict the spread of fire. This addition has been present on U.S. aircraft carriers since World War II, after the fires caused by kamikaze attacks.

The first ships were designed around the time of the Vietnam War, and certain aspects of the design were influenced by operations there. To a certain extent, the carrier operations in Vietnam demonstrated the need for increased capabilities of aircraft carriers over their survivability; they were used to send sorties into the war and were, therefore, less subject to attack. As a result of this experience, Nimitz-class carriers were designed with larger stores of aviation fuel and larger magazines compared to previous carriers, although this was partly a result of increased space available by the new design of the ships' propulsion systems.

A major purpose of the carriers was initially to support the U.S. military during the Cold War. They were designed with capabilities for that role, including using nuclear power instead of oil for greater endurance and the ability to adjust their weapons systems on the basis of new intelligence and technological developments. They were initially categorized only as attack carriers, but ships have been constructed with anti-submarine capabilities since . As a result, the ships and their aircraft can participate in a wide range of operations, including sea and air blockades; mine laying; and missile strikes on land, air, and sea.

Because of a design flaw, ships of this class have inherent lists to starboard when under combat loads that exceed the capability of their list control systems. The problem appears to be especially prevalent on some of the more modern vessels. This problem has been previously rectified by using damage control voids for ballast, but a solution using solid ballast that does not affect the ship's survivability has been proposed.

Construction
All ten Nimitz-class carriers were constructed between 1968 and 2006 at Newport News Shipbuilding in Newport News, Virginia.

This means that whole sections could be welded together with plumbing and electrical equipment already fitted, improving efficiency. The modules were lifted into the dry dock using gantry cranes and welded. This method was originally developed by Ingalls Shipbuilding and increases the rate of work because much of the fitting out does not have to be carried out within the confines of the already-finished hull.

The total cost of construction for each ship was around $4.5 billion.

Propulsion

All ships of the class are powered by two A4W nuclear reactors, housed in separate compartments. The reactors produce heat through nuclear fission, which heats water. This is then passed through four turbines, which are shared by the two reactors.

The Nimitz-class ships constructed since  also have bulbous bows to improve speed and fuel efficiency by reducing wave-making resistance. As a result of nuclear power, the ships are capable of operating continuously for over 20 years without refueling and are predicted to have a service life of over 50 years.

Armament and protection

In addition to the aircraft carried on board, the ships carry defensive equipment for use against missiles and hostile aircraft. These consist of either two or three RIM-7 Sea Sparrow or RIM-162 Evolved SeaSparrow Missile Mk 29 missile launchers designed for defense against aircraft and anti-ship missiles, as well as either three or four 20 mm Phalanx CIWS.

These will be installed on the other ships as they return for Refueling Complex Overhaul (RCOH). Since USS Theodore Roosevelt, the carriers have been constructed with  Kevlar armor over vital spaces, and earlier ships have been retrofitted with it: Nimitz in 1983–1984, Dwight D. Eisenhower from 1985 to 1987 and Carl Vinson in 1989.

The ships' other countermeasures are four Sippican SRBOC (super rapid bloom off-board chaff) six-barrel MK36 decoy launchers, which deploy infrared flares and chaff to disrupt the sensors of incoming missiles; an SSTDS torpedo defense system; and an AN/SLQ-25 Nixie torpedo countermeasures system. The carriers also use AN/SLQ-32(V) jamming systems to detect and disrupt hostile radar signals in addition to the electronic warfare capabilities of some of the aircraft on board.

The presence of nuclear weapons on board U.S. aircraft carriers since the end of the Cold War has neither been confirmed nor denied by the U.S. government. As a result, the presence of a U.S. aircraft carrier in a foreign port has occasionally provoked protest from local people, for example, when Nimitz visited Chennai, India, in 2007. At that time, the Strike Group commander Rear Admiral John Terence Blake stated, "The U.S. policy [...] is that we do not routinely deploy nuclear weapons on board Nimitz."

In May 2013, George H.W. Bush conducted the first carrier-borne end-to-end at-sea test of the Surface Ship Torpedo Defense System (SSTDS). The SSTDS combined the passive detection of the Torpedo Warning System (TWS) that finds, classifies, and tracks torpedoes with the hard-kill capability of a Countermeasure Anti-Torpedo (CAT), an encapsulated miniature torpedo designed to locate, home in on, and destroy hostile torpedoes. This was to increase protection against wake-homing torpedoes like the Type 53 that do not respond to acoustic decoys. The pieces of the SSTDS were engineered to locate and destroy incoming torpedoes in a matter of seconds; each system included one TWS and 8 CATs. Initial operational capability (IOC) was planned for 2019, and all aircraft carriers were to be outfitted by 2035. The Navy suspended work on the project in September 2018 due to poor reliability of the components; hardware, already installed on five carriers, is to be removed by 2023.

Carrier air wing

In order for a carrier to deploy, it must embark one of ten Carrier Air Wings (CVW). The carriers can accommodate a maximum of 130 F/A-18 Hornets or 85–90 aircraft of different types, but current numbers are typically 64 aircraft. Although the air wings are integrated with the operation of the carriers they are deployed to, they are regarded as separate entities. As well as the aircrew, the air wings are also made up of support personnel involved in roles including maintenance, aircraft and ordnance handling, and emergency procedures. Each person on the flight deck wears color-coded clothing to make their role easily identifiable.

A typical carrier air wing can include 24–36 F/A-18E or F Super Hornets as strike fighters; two squadrons of 10–12 F/A-18C Hornets, with one of these often provided by the U.S. Marine Corps (VMFA), also as strike fighters; 4–6 EA-18G Growlers for electronic warfare; 4–6 E-2C or D Hawkeyes for airborne early warning (AEW), C-2 Greyhounds used for logistics (to be replaced by MV-22 Ospreys); and a Helicopter Anti-Submarine Squadron of 6–8 SH-60F and HH-60H Seahawks. Aircraft previously operated from Nimitz-class carriers include F-4 Phantoms, RA-5C Vigilantes, RF-8G Crusaders, F-14 Tomcats, S-3 Vikings, EA-3B Skywarriors, EA-6B Prowlers, A-7 Corsair II, and A-6E Intruder aircraft.

Flight deck and aircraft facilities

The flight deck is angled at nine degrees, which allows for aircraft to be launched and recovered simultaneously. This angle of the flight deck was reduced slightly compared to previous carriers, as the current design improves the airflow around the carrier. Four steam catapults are used to launch fixed-wing aircraft, and four arrestor wires are used for recovery. The two newest carriers,  Ronald Reagan and George H.W. Bush, have only three arrestor wires each, as the fourth was used infrequently on earlier ships and was therefore deemed unnecessary.

This CATOBAR arrangement allows for faster launching and recovery as well as a much wider range of aircraft that can be used on board compared with smaller aircraft carriers, most of which use a simpler STOVL arrangement without catapults or arrestor wires. The ship's aircraft operations are controlled by the air boss from Primary Flight Control or Pri-Fly. Four large elevators transport aircraft between the flight deck and the hangars below. These hangars are divided into three bays by thick steel doors that are designed to restrict the spread of fire.

Strike groups

When an aircraft carrier deploys, it takes a Carrier Strike Group (CSG), made up of several other warships and supply vessels that allow the operation to be carried out. The armament of the Nimitz class is made up only of short-range defensive weapons, used as a last line of defense against enemy missiles and aircraft. As with all surface ships, an aircraft carrier is particularly vulnerable to attack from below, specifically from submarines. An aircraft carrier is a very expensive, hard to replace, and strategically valuable asset, and therefore it logically has immense value as a target.

As a result of its target value and vulnerability, aircraft carriers are always escorted by at least one submarine for protection. The other vessels in the Strike Group provide additional capabilities, such as long-range Tomahawk missiles or the Aegis Combat System, and protect the carrier from attack. A typical Strike Group may include, in addition to an aircraft carrier: up to six surface combatants, including guided-missile cruisers and guided-missile destroyers, used primarily for anti-aircraft warfare and anti-submarine warfare, and frigates/guided-missile frigates, prior to their retirement from USN service. When the Navy commissions a new class of frigates (FFG(X)), they will again accompany CSGs. Also making up part of the group is one or two attack submarines for seeking out and destroying hostile surface ships and submarines and an ammunition, oiler, and supply ship from Military Sealift Command to provide logistical support. The numbers and types of vessels that make up each strike group can vary from group to group, depending on deployments, mission, and availability.

Design differences within the class
While the designs of the last seven ships, beginning with Theodore Roosevelt, differ slightly from those of the earlier ships, the U.S. Navy considers all ten carriers a single class. When the older carriers come in for Refueling and Complex Overhaul (RCOH), their nuclear power plants are refueled, and they are upgraded to the standards of the later carriers. Other modifications may be performed to update the ships' equipment.

The ships were initially classified only as attack carriers but have been constructed with anti-submarine capabilities since Carl Vinson. These improvements include more advanced radar systems and facilities enabling the ships to operate aircraft in a more effective anti-submarine warfare role, including fitting common undersea picture (CUP) technology, which uses sonar to allow for better assessment of the threat from submarines. The changes included better support for S-3 Viking ASW patrol planes and SH-60F Seahawk helicopters with dipping sonar systems.

Theodore Roosevelt and later carriers have slight structural differences from the earlier Nimitz carriers, such as improved protection for ordnance stored in their magazines. Other improvements include upgraded flight deck ballistic protection, first installed on George Washington, and the high-strength low-alloy steel (HSLA-100) used for constructing ships starting with John C. Stennis. More recently, older ships have had their flight decks upgraded with a new non-slip material fitted on new-build ships to improve safety for crew members and aircraft.

The last carrier of the class, George H.W. Bush, was designed as a "transition ship" from the Nimitz class to the replacement . George H.W. Bush incorporates new technologies, including improved propeller and bulbous bow designs, a reduced radar cross-section, and electronic and environmental upgrades. The ship's cost was $6.2 billion. The earlier Nimitz-class ships each cost around $4.5 billion. To lower costs, some new technologies and design features were also incorporated into USS Ronald Reagan, the previous carrier, including a redesigned island.

Ships in class
The United States Navy lists the following ten ships in the Nimitz class:

Service history

1975–1989
One of the first major operations in which the ships were involved was Operation Eagle Claw launched by Nimitz in 1980 after she had deployed to the Indian Ocean in response to the taking of hostages in the U.S. embassy in Tehran. Although initially part of the U.S. Atlantic Fleet, Dwight D. Eisenhower relieved Nimitz in this operation after her service in the Mediterranean Sea. Nimitz conducted a Freedom of Navigation exercise alongside the aircraft carrier  in August 1981 in the Gulf of Sidra, near Libya. During this exercise, two of the ship's F-14 Tomcats shot down two Libyan aircraft in what became known as the Gulf of Sidra incident. In 1987, Carl Vinson participated in the first U.S. carrier deployment in the Bering Sea, and Nimitz provided security during the 1988 Olympic Games in Seoul.

1990–2000

The two most significant deployments the Nimitz class was involved in during the 1990s were the Gulf War and its aftermath and Operation Southern Watch in southern Iraq. All active vessels were engaged in both of these to some extent, with Operation Southern Watch continuing until 2003. Most carriers in operation in Operation Desert Shield and Operation Desert Storm played supporting roles, with only Theodore Roosevelt playing an active part in combat operations.

Throughout the 1990s and more recently, Nimitz-class carriers have been deployed as part of humanitarian missions. While deployed in the Gulf War, Abraham Lincoln was diverted to the Pacific Ocean to participate alongside 22 other ships in Operation Fiery Vigil, evacuating civilians following the eruption of Mount Pinatubo on Luzon Island in the Philippines. In October 1993, Abraham Lincoln deployed to Somalia to assist UN humanitarian operations there, spending four weeks flying patrols around Mogadishu while supporting U.S. troops during Operation Restore Hope. The same ship also participated in Operation Vigilant Sentinel in the Persian Gulf in 1995.

Theodore Roosevelt flew patrols in support of the Kurds over northern Iraq as part of Operation Provide Comfort in 1991. In 1996, George Washington played a peacekeeping role in Operation Decisive Endeavor in Bosnia and Herzegovina. In 1999, Theodore Roosevelt was called to the Ionian Sea to support Operation Allied Force alongside other NATO militaries.

2001–present

Harry S. Trumans maiden deployment was in November 2000. The carrier's air wing flew 869 combat sorties in support of Operation Southern Watch, including a strike on Iraqi air defense sites on 16 February 2001, in response to Iraqi surface-to-air missile fire against United Nations coalition forces.

After the September 11 attacks, Carl Vinson and Theodore Roosevelt were among the first warships to participate in Operation Enduring Freedom in Afghanistan. Carl Vinson sailed towards the Persian Gulf intending to support Operation Southern Watch in July 2001. This changed in response to the attacks, and the ship changed course to travel towards the North Arabian Sea, where she launched the first airstrikes in support of the operation on 7 October 2001.

Following the attacks, John C. Stennis and George Washington participated in Operation Noble Eagle, carrying out homeland security operations off the West Coast of the United States. All active ships have been involved in Iraq and Afghanistan since that time. This included the invasion in 2003, as well as providing subsequent support for Operation Iraqi Freedom since then.

The carriers have also provided aid after natural disasters. In 2005, Abraham Lincoln supported Operation Unified Assistance in Indonesia after the December 2004 tsunami, and Harry S. Truman provided aid after Hurricane Katrina later in 2005. 

The Ronald Reagan Carrier Strike Group performed humanitarian assistance and disaster relief operations in the Philippines in June 2008 after Typhoon Fengshen, which killed hundreds from the central island regions and the main island of Luzon. In January 2010, Carl Vinson operated off Haiti, providing aid and drinking water to earthquake survivors as part of the U.S.-led Operation Unified Response, alongside other major warships and hospital ship .

Refueling Complex Overhaul

In order to refuel their nuclear power plants, the carriers each undergo a Refueling and Overhaul (RCOH) once in their service lives. This is also the most substantial overhaul the ships undergo while in service and involves bringing the vessels' equipment up to the standards of the newest ships. The ship is placed in a dry dock, and essential maintenance is carried out, including painting the hull below the waterline and replacing electrical and mechanical components such as valves. Because of the large time periods between the ships' constructions, the armament and designs of the newer ships are more modern than those of the older ships. In RCOH, the older ships are refitted to the standards of the newer ships, which can include upgrades to the flight deck, aircraft catapults, combat systems, and radar systems; precise details can vary significantly between the ships. The improvements normally take around four years to complete. The RCOH for USS Theodore Roosevelt took four years to complete (2009–2013) and cost about $2.6 billion. Planned Incremental Availability is a similar procedure, although it is less substantial and does not involve refueling the nuclear power plants.

Symbolic and diplomatic roles

Because of their status as the largest warships in the U.S. Navy, the deployment of an aircraft carrier can fulfill a symbolic role, not just as a deterrent to an enemy but often as a diplomatic tool in strengthening relations with allies and potential allies. The latter of these functions can occur either as a single visit to a country, in which senior naval officers are allowed to observe the operation of the carrier and interact with its senior officers, or as part of an international task force. This can be in combat operations, such as the NATO bombing of Yugoslavia in 1999, or training deployments, such as Exercise RIMPAC. In addition, carriers have participated in international Maritime security operations, combating piracy in the Persian Gulf and off the coast of Somalia.

Accidents and incidents
On 26 May 1981, an EA-6B Prowler crashed on the flight deck of Nimitz, killing 14 crewmen and injuring 45 others. Forensic testing of the personnel involved showed that several tested positive for marijuana. While this was not found to have directly caused the crash, the investigation's findings prompted the introduction of mandatory drug testing of all service personnel.

Pilots have been able to eject safely in several cases of ditched aircraft. However, fatal aircraft crashes have occurred; in 1994, Lieutenant Kara Hultgreen, the first female F-14 Tomcat pilot, was killed while attempting to land on board Abraham Lincoln during a training exercise.

The fire was caused by unauthorized smoking near improperly stored flammable refrigerant compressor oil.

Future and planned replacement

Nimitz-class carriers were initially designed to have a 50-year service life. At the end of their service life, ships will be decommissioned. This process will first take place on Nimitz and is estimated to cost from $750 to $900 million. This compares with an estimated $53 million for a conventionally powered carrier. Most of the difference in cost is attributed to the deactivation of the nuclear power plants and the safe removal of radioactive material and other contaminated equipment.

A new class of carriers, the Gerald R. Ford class, is being constructed to replace previous vessels after decommissioning. Ten of these are expected, and the first has entered service as of 22 July 2017 to replace . Most of the rest of these new carriers are to replace the oldest Nimitz ships as they reach the end of their service lives. The new carriers will have a similar design to George H.W. Bush (using an almost identical hull shape) and technological and structural improvements.

The Navy reported in early 2022 that it was conducting a study to determine if the Nimitz-class carrier lives could be extended to as long as 55 years.

See also
 Aircraft Carrier (Medium)
 List of aircraft carrier classes of the United States Navy
 List of aircraft carriers of the United States Navy
 List of aircraft carriers
 List of naval ship classes in service
 Modern US Navy carrier air operations
 Naval aviation
 Timeline of aircraft carriers of the United States Navy

Notes

Footnotes

Citations

References

Further reading

External links

 Discovery channel video
 Busting the speed myth of USS Enterprise and Nimitz-class nuclear-powered supercarrier, a special report by NavWeaps.Com
 CVN-68 Nimitz-class Modernization – GlobalSecurity.org

 
Naval ships of the United States
 Nimitz-class aircraft carriers
Aircraft carrier classes
 Nimitz-class aircraft carriers